William Ernest Bain (born August 9, 1952) is a former American football offensive lineman in the National Football League (NFL).

High school and college careers
Bain attended St. Paul High School, where he played for coach Marijon Ancich.  Bain played college football at the University of Southern California and was an All-America offensive lineman in 1974.  Bain also played at University of Colorado and San Diego City College.

Professional career
Bain played 11 seasons in the NFL. He played for the Green Bay Packers (1975), the Denver Broncos (1976, 1978), the Los Angeles Rams (1979–1985), the New England Patriots (1986), and the New York Jets (1986).

Personal life
Bain and his wife, Elizabeth(Liz), have four daughters: Jennifer, Kristen, Anne (Annie), Elizabeth (Bitty). He currently resides in East Greenwich, RI.

References

1952 births
Living people
American football offensive guards
American football offensive tackles
Colorado Buffaloes football players
Denver Broncos players
Green Bay Packers players
Los Angeles Rams players
New England Patriots players
New York Jets players
USC Trojans football players
Players of American football from Los Angeles